Fiona Kumari Campbell (born 1963) is a disability studies researcher and theorist, focusing on disability in relation to law, technology, advocacy, and desire. She is currently a Senior Lecturer in the School of Education and Social Work at the University of Dundee, Scotland. She is also an adjunct professor in Disability Studies with the Faculty of Medicine at the University of Kelaniya, Sri Lanka. Her specific research on ableism focuses on how notions of disabled and able-bodies are recited in the dominant discourse of society. In particular, her book, Contours of Ableism, attempts to challenge "notions of what constitutes 'normal' and 'pathological' bodies" and what truly distinguishes the "able body" from the "disabled body."

Early life and influences 

Fiona Kumari Campbell was born in Melbourne, Australia, to a family of Scottish and Sri Lankan-Jewish descent and identifies as biracial/Asian. Her early ideas about difference and the politics of race were developed by her own early childhood experiences of growing up under Australia's White Australia policy and the treatment of her Asian mother. Although her father died at the age of 33 when Campbell was nine years old, his preoccupations with the Classics, theology, philosophy, and socialist politics left an indelible impression on her learning and understanding of the world. Campbell had an uneven education, leaving home at sixteen and eventually finishing her final Higher School Certificate at the Croydon High Evening School in 1980 under the tutelage of Dr. Norman W. Saffin, who also schooled Australian sociologist Peter Beilharz and Marxist-Feminist researcher Dr. Patricia Morrigan.

Education 

Fiona Kumari Campbell has long been interested in the study of the civil rights of people from marginal backgrounds. She has focused on the consequences of discrimination and social oppression. Campbell is a scholar of disability studies, sociology, cultural studies, and legal theory, all of which can be found in much of her published cross-disciplinary research. Campbell's writing relates to issues of philosophy, Buddhism, disability, Sri Lankan disability, law, technology, and marginality.

Campbell started her education at La Trobe University attending on a part-time basis between 1987 and 1998, where she received a 1st Class BLS (Hons) in Law and Sociology. In 1999, after being awarded an Australian Postgraduate Award (APA), she returned to university where she graduated with a PhD in Sociology, Humanities, and Law from Queensland University of Technology, under the supervision of Professor Gavin Kendall. Campbell went on to receive a Certificate in Higher Research Degree Supervision in 2005 from Griffith University and in 2014, she received an Advanced Diploma in Theology, Systematic Theology, Catholic Liturgy, and Buddhist Studies from MCD University of Divinity.

Career 

Campbell began her career as a shelter workshop employee before moving on to work in the community services sector, where she focused on projects involving poverty and disability. She moved out of the community services sector; She worked in the National Government's disability policy positions before finally settling on academia. Campbell undertook a brief stint with the Australian Benedictine religious order, the Sisters of the Good Samaritan.

In 2003, Campbell joined Griffith University's Logan campus as the Convenor of the Disabilities Program in the School of Human Services and Social Work, which is considered to be Australia's largest postgraduate disability program. In 2009, Campbell published her first book, Contours of Ableism, before leaving school the following year. In 2011, she took up the position of Deputy Head (Learning and Teaching Scholarship) with the Griffith Law School, holding the substantive position of Associate Professor until June 2014. In 2016, Campbell joined the faculty of the School of Health and Wellbeing at the University of Southern Queensland and was appointed as the program director of human services.

With over 18 years of teaching experience, Campbell has taught at several universities in Australia, such as Griffith University, Victoria University, University of Kelaniya, and Queensland University of Technology. She has taught on the subjects of human rights, diversity studies, sociology and law theory, and Australian politics and disability studies.

In January 2017, Campbell joined the School of Social Work at the University of Dundee in Scotland. Currently, Campbell is also working on two books: #Ableism: An Interdisciplinary Introduction to Studies in Ableism  and Textures of Ableism: Essays on Ablement, Silence, and Voice 

As well as being a disability activist, Campbell played an integral role in the government and non-government sectors. She advised former Ministers of Community Services, Senator Don Grimes and Dr. Neil Blewitt, playing a fundamental role in the establishment of attendant care in Australia.
             
Campbell's contributions to academic journals include the international advisory board of the Socio-Legal Review, Journal of Literary and Cultural Disability Studies (Liverpool),  ethnographic: Journal of Disability and Culture (Leuven, Belgium), the International Review of Disability Studies, and associate editor, Journal of Social Inclusion (Griffith); And the scientific board of the Italian Journal of Disability Studies.

Important writings 

When discussing Fiona Campbell, it is important to note that she, herself, is an incomplete quadriplegic and experiences other chronic illnesses. Campbell uses her experience of disability to inform and educate people on the nature by which ableism and dis-ableism come about and how conversations are created through different mediums of this discourse. Campbell has published essays, which discuss topics dealing with the production of disability itself, "The Ableist Project," and how Ableism and abledment  are created through an examination of The Critical Race Theory.

Contours of Ableism: The Production of Disability and Ableness

Campbell wrote Contours of Ableism not as an introduction to disability, but to broaden the spectrum of learning for those already immersed in the field. The book allows for an addition to social scientific texts regarding disability. Campbell's writings are erudite, cultured expansions of the theory she created coined the "ableist project." In each of her chapters, she focuses on a different topical area that lends a hand to elaborating and exaggerating how ableism plays a role in daily social life. Each of the chapters, while generalizing and describing different topical areas, develops a binary dynamic of ableism and dis-ableism. This binary dynamic is described throughout her writings through a variety of contexts including law, education, medicine, and science and technology.

The Ableist Project is an explanation of the three steps Campbell proposes in order to deal with the problematic conversation that is ableism. Campbell first explores the problems with people thinking,  feeling, and speaking about the "other" (otthisher being the disabled person). It is here that she argues that it is important to shift the focus, the disability itself to the research and understanding of ableism. Her second task deals with what can be described as "ableist relations." This includes anything that may be even remotely accurate in the conversation involving what is and what is not characterized as "ableist". Finally, in order to make the true connection, she looks at real-life examples in which examples of ability are portrayed and how this differs from examples of disability.

Ableism examined through Critical Race Theory (CRT)

Campbell explores an assessment of critical race theory and how this theory can contribute to different thoughts associated with ableism, and disability in general. The main focus of the paper deals with the idea of internalized racism and how its application in critical race theory applies to disability studies. Campbell explores the ways that racism and ableism are internalized and reflected in the process of understanding the convergence of the two across conversation.

"Aids and equipment"

In this essay, Campbell argues again for the shift in redefining disability. She is in favor of directing the definition toward a more social construction. She relays information regarding the OPCS study which indicates that over 6 million adults and 14 percent of people living in households have some form of disability, the most common stemming from mobility and leaning into hearing and personal care. Campbell's main argument in this piece is that with so many people in need of medical assistance or aid, the finding of these avenues and solutions should not be so difficult and frustrating. She explains the quantitative/survey methods that were adopted in order to successfully identify the ease at which people are able to receive the aids and care they need or desire, and found that prior research was correct in their negative accusations of availability.

Keywords for Disability study 

Campbell focuses on long time social oppression and discrimination appearance of disabled people and tried to stand for their rights. Unconsciously, some words used in disability studies have negative connotations. Campbell tried to change and redefine some of the key concepts. Key concepts include:
 Ability - Medium that signified a quality in a person that makes an action possible; someone who can execute an expected range of actions in able-bodied, a person who can lead a potentially worthy life. 
 Disablism - Set of assumptions (conscious or unconscious) and practices that promote the differential or unequal treatment of people because of actual or presumed disability. 
 Interrogating ableism - Thinking about what being abled means today in different contexts, and how those meaning intersect with other ideologies of body and mind such as race, gender, sexuality, and coloniality.
 Stigma - Part of the complex of factors that transform impairment into disability.
 Complex embodiment - becoming a more central subject of public and academic discourse

Honours and awards 

Recognitions that honor Campbell's work and writings include the D. M. Myers University Medal in 1998 by La Trobe University, the Deans' Medal (Faculty of Law & Management), the Jean Martin Prize in Sociology and the Blake, and the Dawson Waldron - 4th year Legal Studies Prize.

YouTube series 

Fiona Kumari Campbell has a series of conferences and discussions filmed and posted to her YouTube Channel. YouTube is an outlet for outlining Studies in Ableism. The current videos discuss her book Contours of Ableism and specific problems the public has with disabilities.

Ableism has been studied for several decades. Campbell fights for the idea of able-ness to grow and become more widespread. She defines who is a disabled person. Disability activism needs to include more individuals who are disabled. However, most disabled individuals stray away from disability activism because in people who see are not disabled see disability as a personal tragedy, harmful and not normal, and may view activism as a cry out for people's pain and suffering. The encounter with society one may feel rejection, and it's the social interaction that causes the spotlight on disabilities. It is not common it does not mean abnormality; diversity is something that should be embraced not looked down on.

Campbell is very passionate about advocating with disabilities because she herself has a disability. She refers to herself as a disability studies scholar. She explains that people with disabilities live precarious lives. The capacity to move in a flourishing way is compromised. She continues to explain that, "Ableism closes off possibility and imagination, ontologically killing people."

Fiona Campbell believes that the way we think about disabilities has to change. She questions why we have discomfort with people with disabilities. We exaggerate the idea of disabilities within individuals. There has to be a shift in thinking for disabilities studies. She shares her concept of "normative shadows." Campbell explains that we are all disabled in some sense.

Professional membership 

Campbell is affiliated to the following professional organizations:
 Australian Institute of International Affairs
 Asian Studies Association of Australia
 Australasian Association of Buddhist Studies
 Queensland Law Society (Associate)
 Australia Law Teachers Association
 Named scholar, International Network of Literary Disability Scholars, Liverpool.
 HERDSA (Higher Education Research & Development Society of Australasia) Canberra
 Fellow, Royal Asiatic Society of Sri Lanka
 Cultural Studies Association of Australasia
 Australian Law & Society Association – founding involvement
 Society for Disability Studies
 National Disability Practitioners
 The Australian Sociological Association (TASA)

Publications and bibliography 

 Contours of Ableism, Fiona Kumari (2009) Griffith University, Australia
 Campbell Refusing Able(ness), Fiona Kumari Campbell (2008) M/C Journal
 Disability Studies Quarterly, Fiona Kumari Campbell (2005-06-15) Griffith University, Australia
 Litigation Neurosis: Pathological Responses or Rational Subversion? Fiona Kumari Campbell (2006) School of Human Services and Social Work, Griffith University
 The Case of Clint Hallam's Wayward Hand,  Fiona Kumari Campbell(2003) Griffith University
 A Review of Disability Law and Legal Mobilisation in Sri Lanka, Fiona Kumari Campbell (2012-01-03) University of Kelaniya
 Listening & Voice: Encounters with Memory & the Politics of Regret,  Fiona Kumari Campbell (2010-09-07) Griffith Law School Children in same-sex families,  Fiona Kumari Campbell (2005) Pearson
 Geodisability knowledge: Watching for Global North imposions,  Fiona Kumari Campbell (2005) School of Human Services and Social Work, Griffith University
 Mind the Gap! The Challenge of Widening Social Cleavages , Fiona Kumari Campbell (2012-12-18) Journal of Social Inclusion

References

External links 
 YouTube account
 Academia account
 University of Dundee, Discovery Research portal

1963 births
Living people
Griffith University alumni
La Trobe University alumni
Queensland University of Technology alumni
Women sociologists
University of Divinity alumni